The Benjamin Henry Grierson House is a historic house located at 852 East State Street in Jacksonville, Illinois. Built circa 1850, the house was the home of U.S. Army general Benjamin Grierson from 1850 until his death. Grierson was a  music teacher, band leader, and mercantile businessman in Jacksonville, Illinois, from 1850 until 1861, when he joined the Union Army after the outbreak of the Civil War. During the war, Grierson led the eponymous Grierson's Raid, a mission which cut Confederate supply lines and diverted Confederate forces during the Vicksburg Campaign. After the war, Grierson served as colonel of the 10th Cavalry Regiment, one of the original Buffalo Soldier regiments of African-American cavalry. Grierson was appointed brigadier general in 1890 and retired from the Army in the same year; his house in Jacksonville served as his permanent address for his entire time in the Army.

The house was added to the National Register of Historic Places on November 20, 1980.

References

External links
 Major General Benjamin H. Grierson's Family Home - General Grierson Society

Houses on the National Register of Historic Places in Illinois
Italianate architecture in Illinois
Houses in Morgan County, Illinois
National Register of Historic Places in Morgan County, Illinois